Birmingham Central Synagogue is an Orthodox synagogue situated in Edgbaston, Birmingham, England.

History
The Ashkenazi Orthodox community was established in a private house in Belgrave Road in 1883 before moving to Wrottesley Street in 1900 and then to Bristol Street in 1928, taking over a former Methodist Hall. In 1961 a small group of individuals acquired the large plot of land upon which a synagogue, hall and classrooms were built at 133 Pershore Road. The ground breaking ceremony took place in July 1958. Construction of the 1960s building took place between 1959 and 1961.

Sale and redevelopment
The congregation voted to sell the Pershore Road shul in 2010. For the next few years they had to wait to get planning permission from both Birmingham City Council and Calthorpe Estates.

Redevelopment of the Malcolm Locker Hall into the new synagogue began in January 2013. Work was completed in July 2013, with the handover taking place in August 2013.

Of the 42 etched glass windows in the old building, only 6 could be saved (and were installed in the new shul). The other 36 were to be sold (some broke when they were removed).

From August 2013 the old building was in the hands of the developers, who had to first remove asbestos. The old shul building was completely demolished during October 2013.
The developers Seddon will build a 70-bed care home for Gracewell Healthcare on the former synagogue site.

Current synagogue
The new synagogue at 4 Speedwell Road is adjacent to the site of the former Pershore Road building (now demolished and replaced by Gracewell of Edgbaston). Services began in August 2013. By September, the new ark was installed in time for the High Holy Days.
The new Chief Rabbi Ephraim Mirvis consecrated the new building by unveiling a plaque on Sunday 13 October 2013.

Rabbi Chanan Atlas was appointed minister of the shul in early 2012 taking over from Rabbi Shlomo Odze.
Rabbi Atlas and his family left Birmingham, to take up a new position in Manchester. He was replaced by Rabbi Dr Lior Kaminetsky in May 2015, who along with his family stayed for four years until May 2019.

Rabbi Yossi Hambling was appointed the new Rabbi from July 2021. The Induction of Rabbi Hambling took place in March 2022 by the Chief Rabbi.

External links
Birmingham Central Synagogue on Jewish Communities and Records - UK (hosted by jewishgen.org).
Official Website
Photos of the shul windows
Photos of the Chief Rabbi consecrating the new shul

References 

Ashkenazi Jewish culture in England
Ashkenazi synagogues
Edgbaston
Orthodox synagogues in England
Religious buildings and structures in Birmingham, West Midlands